Richard Ulrich (born 1942 in Stuttgart) is a German board game designer. Many of his games have been nominated for or have won the Spiel des Jahres, a German games award.

He is best known for co-authoring the board game El Grande with Wolfgang Kramer.

External links

Board game designers
Living people
1942 births
People from Stuttgart
Date of birth missing (living people)
German game designers